Ehrenbaum is a surname. Notable people with the surname include:

 Ernst Ehrenbaum (1861–1942), German researcher of aquaculture, fishes
 Hans Ehrenbaum-Degele (1889–1915), Jewish German writer

German-language surnames
Jewish surnames
Yiddish-language surnames